Ōmikami may refer to:

Amaterasu, or Amaterasu-ōmikami, Shinto sun goddess
Toyouke-Ōmikami, Shinto goddess of agriculture and industry